During the 1997–98 English football season, Charlton Athletic F.C. competed in the Football League First Division.

Season summary
The 1997–98 season was Charlton's best campaign for years. They reached the Division One play-off final and battled against Sunderland in a thrilling game which ended with a 4–4 draw after extra time. Charlton won 7–6 on penalties, with the match described as "arguably the most dramatic game of football in Wembley's history". With five minutes of normal time remaining, Charlton were losing 3-2 before Richard Rufus scored his first ever senior goal from a corner, forcing the game into extra-time. After the resulting 4–4 draw, the Addicks went on to win the game 7–6 on penalties, thus gaining promotion into the Premier League.

Final league table

Results
Charlton Athletic's score comes first

Legend

Football League First Division

First Division play-offs

FA Cup

League Cup

First-team squad
Squad at end of season

References

Notes

Charlton Athletic F.C. seasons
Charlton Athletic